Broadway Market may refer to the following public markets:

 Broadway Market, Baltimore, Maryland, United States
 Broadway Market, London, England, United Kingdom

See also
 Broadway Market Building, North Carolina, United States